Elefant Mixtape is an EP by Latin hip hop artist Ana Tijoux, released February 2011 on her website. It was produced by DJ Tee and mixed by DJ Dacel.

Track listing

References

2011 albums
Ana Tijoux albums